Africolaria wattersae is a species of sea snail, a marine gastropod mollusk in the family Fasciolariidae, the spindle snails, the tulip snails and their allies.

Description

Distribution
This marine species occurs off South Africa.

References

 Kilburn, R.N. (1974) Taxonomic notes on South African marine Mollusca (3): Gastropoda: Prosobranchia, with descriptions of new taxa of Naticidae, Fasciolariidae, Magilidae, Volutomitridae and Turridae. Annals of the Natal Museum, 22, 187–220
 Marais J.P. & R.N. Kilburn (2010) Fasciolariidae. pp. 106–137, in: Marais A.P. & Seccombe A.D. (eds), Identification guide to the seashells of South Africa. Volume 1. Groenkloof: Centre for Molluscan Studies. 376 pp.
 Snyder M.A., Vermeij G.J. & Lyons W.G. (2012) The genera and biogeography of Fasciolariinae (Gastropoda, Neogastropoda, Fasciolariidae). Basteria 76(1–3): 31–70.

Endemic fauna of South Africa
Fasciolariidae
Gastropods described in 1974